The Yingwuzhou Yangtze River Bridge is a bridge carrying the southern section of the Second Ring Road over the Yangtze River in Wuhan, Hubei Province, China. It is one of the longest suspension bridges in the world with two consecutive  spans. The bridge cost 3.08 billion yuan to build and opened on December 28, 2014.
Yingwuzhou literally means "parrot island," a famous island that was mentioned many times in Tang dynasty poems, but has now been part of Hanyang due to the redirection of the river.

See also
 Bridges and tunnels across the Yangtze River
 List of longest suspension bridge spans
 List of largest bridges in China

References

Bridges in Wuhan
Bridges over the Yangtze River
Bridges completed in 2014
Suspension bridges in China
2014 establishments in China